Xenosaurus penai, Pena's knob-scaled lizard, is a lizard found in Mexico.

References

Xenosauridae
Reptiles described in 2000
Reptiles of Mexico